The Sierra Nevada upper montane forest is a vegetation type found below the treeline in the United States Sierra Nevada range. It is generally located above the mixed coniferous forest and below the alpine zone.  Overstory trees are typically cone shaped to shed the snow.

Characteristic trees including lodgepole pine (Pinus contorta), Jeffrey pine (Pinus jeffreyi), western white pine (Pinus monticola) California red fir (Abies magnifica), and Sierra juniper (Juniperus grandis), and typical understory trees and shrubs such as huckleberry oak (Quercus vaccinifolia) and red heather (Phyllodoce breweri).

Environment
On the eastern slopes, it is at higher elevations. Growing season is about four months because of long-lasting, deep snow.

References

Forests of the Sierra Nevada (United States)
Ecoregions of California
Montane forests
Temperate coniferous forests of the United States